Richard Gibson Andrews (born December 22, 1955) is a United States district judge of the United States District Court for the District of Delaware. He is a former Delaware state prosecutor and Assistant United States Attorney.

Early life and education 
Andrews earned a Bachelor of Arts degree from Haverford College in 1977 and a Juris Doctor from the University of California, Berkeley School of Law in 1981. From 1981 until 1982, Andrews served as a law clerk for Judge Collins J. Seitz on the United States Court of Appeals for the Third Circuit.

Professional career 
From 1983 until 2006, Andrews worked as an Assistant United States Attorney for the District of Delaware. In 2007, Andrews was chosen as state Prosecutor for the state of Delaware.

Federal judicial service
On May 11, 2011, President Barack Obama nominated Andrews to a seat on the United States District Court for the District of Delaware, to fill the vacancy created when Judge Joseph James Farnan, Jr. retired on July 31, 2010. On September 8, 2011, the Senate Judiciary Committee reported his nomination to the Senate floor by voice vote. On November 3, 2011, the Senate confirmed Andrews by unanimous consent. He received his commission on November 7, 2011.

References

External links

1955 births
Living people
20th-century American lawyers
21st-century American lawyers
Assistant United States Attorneys
Haverford College alumni
Judges of the United States District Court for the District of Delaware
Lawyers from Manchester
People from Wilmington, Delaware
State attorneys
United States Attorneys for the District of Delaware
United States district court judges appointed by Barack Obama
21st-century American judges
UC Berkeley School of Law alumni
British emigrants to the United States